EuroNight, abbreviated EN, is a European train category which denotes many main-line national and international night train services within the Western and Central European inter-city rail network.

Overview
The classification and name were brought into use in May 1993. Unlike the equivalent day-running counterparts EuroCity and InterCity trains, the EuroNight trains tend to run during the nighttime and are equipped with various cars for accommodating sleep services. Nearly all EuroNight trains require reservations and additional fare-supplements in addition to the regular cost of a ticket from the destination to the arrival point. These supplements vary in price depending on whether the traveler wishes to sit in a regular seat, a couchette "lying bed" which offers a padded, felt bed with a blanket and small pillow, or a sleeping bed which allows a mattress bed with full bedding (sheets, comforters, pillows).

Nearly all EuroNight services are international and jointly operated by national rail companies sharing cars on a route. EN trains are the standard night-train service for Western and most Central European nations. They are distinct from the older D-Nacht services, many of which still operate in Central and Eastern Europe. EN trains have criteria that rail companies must match in order to receive EN designation; the numbering format is EN 999; many routes also have accompanying names derived in the 19th and 20th centuries.

Operating carriers
The following carriers currently have designated cars and train conductors who work the EN lines. Many railway companies share cars on the same train line between routes; for example, EN 235 between Vienna and Rome share cars of both the ÖBB and Trenitalia.

 Austria's ÖBB (introducing in December 2016 its Nightjet-Services)
 Croatia's HŽ
 Czech Republic's ČD
 France's SNCF (as part of their Intercités de nuit brand)
 Germany's DB (as part of their City Night Line brand; shut down by December 2016)
 Hungary's MÁV
 Italy's Trenitalia
 Luxembourg's CFL
 Netherlands, The NS Hispeed
 Poland's PKP Intercity
 Romania's CFR
 Slovakia's ZSSK
 Spain's Renfe Operadora
 Sweden's SJ
 Switzerland's SBB

Deutsche Bahn operated the additional City Night Line hotel-quality night services between Germany, Italy, the Czech Republic, Switzerland, and The Netherlands. Two of those, the Kopernikus and the Canopus, are designated EuroNight trains as EN 458/459. However, Deutsche Bahn terminated all of its own night train services by December 2016.

List of EuroNight trains

See also
 Train categories in Europe
 EuroCity

References

Railway services introduced in 1993
Railteam
Rail transport brands
Rail transport in Europe
Night trains
Passenger rail transport in Germany